Frio County is a county located in the U.S. state of Texas. As of the 2020 census, its population was 18,385. The county seat is Pearsall. The county was created in 1858 and later organized in 1871. Frio is named for the Frio River, whose name is Spanish for "cold".

Geography 

Major highways 
  Interstate 35
  U.S. Highway 57
  State Highway 85
  State Highway 173

Adjacent counties 
 Medina County (north)
 Atascosa County (east)
 McMullen County (southeast)
 La Salle County (south)
 Dimmit County (southwest)
 Zavala County (west)
 Uvalde County (northwest)

Demographics 

As of the 2020 United States census, there were 18,385 people, 4,673 households, and 3,306 families residing in the county.

As of the census of 2000, 16,252 people, 4,743 households, and 3,642 families resided in the county.  The population density was 14 people per square mile (6/km2).  The 5,660 housing units averaged 5 per square mile (2/km2).  The racial makeup of the county was 71.86% White, 4.87% Black or African American, 0.58% Native American, 0.41% Asian, 0.02% Pacific Islander, 19.76% from other races, and 2.50% from two or more races.  About 73.76% of the population was Hispanic or Latino of any race.

Of the 4,743 households, 40.70% had children under the age of 18 living with them, 55.20% were married couples living together, 16.00% had a female householder with no husband present, and 23.20% were not families. About 20.60% of all households was made up of individuals, and 9.30% had someone living alone who was 65 years of age or older.  The average household size was 2.98 and the average family size was 3.44.

In the county, the population was distributed as 28.70% under the age of 18, 11.20% from 18 to 24, 30.80% from 25 to 44, 18.70% from 45 to 64, and 10.60% who were 65 years of age or older.  The median age was 31 years. For every 100 females, there were 121.40 males.  For every 100 females age 18 and over, there were 130.20 males.

The median income for a household in the county was $24,504, and for a family was $26,578. Males had a median income of $23,810 versus $16,498 for females. The per capita income for the county was $16,069.  About 24.50% of families and 29.00% of the population were below the poverty line, including 36.20% of those under age 18 and 30.40% of those age 65 or over.

Politics 

Frio County has generally leaned Democratic, although it has sometimes voted Republican, including in 2004 and 2020.

Communities

Cities 
 Dilley
 Pearsall (county seat)

Census-designated places 
 Bigfoot
 Hilltop
 Moore
 North Pearsall

Unincorporated areas 
 Derby

Ghost towns 
 Frio Town

Education 
School districts include:
 Charlotte Independent School District
 Devine Independent School District
 Dilley Independent School District
 Hondo Independent School District
 Pearsall Independent School District

The designated community college is Southwest Texas Junior College.

See also 

 National Register of Historic Places listings in Frio County, Texas
 Recorded Texas Historic Landmarks in Frio County
 Winter Garden Region

References

External links 

 Frio County Government
 
 Historic Frio County materials, hosted by the Portal to Texas History.
 Frio County Profile from the Texas Association of Counties 

 
1871 establishments in Texas
Populated places established in 1871
Majority-minority counties in Texas
Hispanic and Latino American culture in Texas